A  is a sumo elder of the Japan Sumo Association (JSA). The benefits are considerable, as only toshiyori are allowed to run and coach in sumo stables, known as heya, and they are also the only former wrestlers given retirement pay.

Process
To become a sumo elder, a retiring wrestler must be a Japanese citizen. This regulation dates from September 1976 and was widely thought to be a result of the success of the 
Hawaiian Takamiyama Daigorō, who had become the first foreign wrestler to win a championship in 1972, and had expressed interest in becoming an elder. Takamiyama ultimately became a Japanese citizen in June 1980 and did become the first foreign-born elder upon his retirement in 1984.

Elders must also have fought at least one tournament in the san'yaku ranks (komusubi and above), or else twenty tournaments in the top makuuchi division or thirty as a sekitori (makuuchi or jūryō division). This replaced the previous qualification of 25 total tournaments in jūryō, or 20 consecutive in jūryō, or one tournament in makuuchi. The rules were further modified in November 2013 to allow membership after only 28 sekitori tournaments in certain circumstances, and former wrestlers who are inheriting an existing stable need only 12 makuuchi tournaments or 20 in jūryō. 

However, membership can only be acquired by acquiring or inheriting toshiyori-kabu, or elder stock, in the JSA. There are only 105 shares available, and the increasing lifespan of elders has meant that they take longer to become vacant. As a result, over the course of many years, the decreasing availability of elder stocks caused their price to greatly increase, with stock reportedly selling for up to 500 million yen. Often the only way wrestlers, even very successful ones, could afford a share is if they have a large and wealthy group of supporters and financial backers. After the sumo association became a "public interest corporation" in the wake of the 2011 match fixing scandal the buying and selling of elder stocks has been prohibited, and possession reverts to the sumo association when an elder retires, and the JSA determines the next holder.

An exception to the purchase requirement was made for some of the most successful former yokozuna, sometimes referred to as dai-yokozuna, who were offered a one-time membership of the JSA, or ichidai-toshiyori status. Three former wrestlers, Taihō, Kitanoumi and Takanohana obtained this status. A fourth, Chiyonofuji, was offered it but preferred a normal share. There were never any official benchmarks, but these four all achieved more than twenty tournament championships in their active career. Although yokozuna Hakuhō won 45 tournaments, a report published in April 2021 by a committee within the JSA recommended that no more ichidai-toshiyori be offered and the meeting's chair declared at a press conference that "no such system exists." This move was widely seen as a slight against Hakuhō, who was nearing retirement at that point. Hakuhō ended up acquiring the Magaki elder stock in the normal way.

Alternatively, former yokozuna of any level of success can stay in the JSA for up to five years under their shikona or ring name, while former ōzeki can stay for three. Musashimaru and Tochiazuma were  examples in 2008 and retiring yokozuna Kakuryū also took this option in 2021. Former wrestlers below that rank, since the abolition of the jun-toshiyori system in December 2006 (which allowed a two-year stay), have no such grace period and must leave the sumo world immediately and permanently unless they have either already purchased a share or can borrow one from a wrestler active in the ring. It is not uncommon for a former wrestler to switch to and from several elder names over the years while searching for a permanent one. Former sekiwake Kotonishiki for example,  borrowed six (Wakamatsu, Takenawa, Asakayama, Araiso, Hidenoyama and Nakamura) different elder names after his retirement in September 2000 before finally procuring the vacant Asahiyama elder name as his own in 2016.

All toshiyori have a mandatory retirement age of 65. In 2014, a new rule was instituted that allowed a 5-year extension to 70 if approved by the board of the JSA. Such special extension toshiyori must take a 30% pay reduction and cannot serve on the JSA board or as stablemasters. It is rare for an elder with a permanent toshiyori name to leave before that time, but there have been a few examples. Former yokozuna Wajima was asked to resign in 1985 after putting up his stock as collateral on a loan, former komusubi Futatsuryū, head of Tokitsukaze stable, was expelled in 2007 because of his involvement in the death of one of his young recruits, and former sekiwake Takatōriki was dismissed in 2010 because of a gambling scandal. The former yokozuna Takanohana retired in 2018 and closed his Takanohana stable after the Takanoiwa affair. The former komusubi Maenoshin and maegashira Kasugafuji and Hamanishiki are other, less high-profile examples.

Ranking
Much like other staff members of the JSA (such as referees and ushers), elders are also subject to a rank structure; only the lowest-ranking members are strictly known as toshiyori. The ranks are as follows:

 rijichō (chief director, primus inter pares among riji)
 riji (director)
 fuku-riji (vice director)
 yakuin taigu iin (executive member)
 iin (committee member)
 shunin (senior member)
 iin taigu toshiyori (elder receiving iin privileges)
 toshiyori (elder)

Promotion up to iin occurs almost exclusively by seniority and is generally a fairly quick process; the majority of all elders are ranked as iin. Two exceptions apply: Elders using a borrowed share cannot be promoted from toshiyori, while very successful former wrestlers (generally, yokozuna and ōzeki) immediately receive full iin privileges as iin taigu toshiyori upon their retirement from active competition, even before their normal advancement up the ladder will take them to shunin and later iin status. However, it is customary for all new elders, even former yokozuna, to be assigned as security guards for the hanamichi in their first tournament after retirement.

Furthermore, the fuku-riji and riji positions require a nomination for and subsequent election to the board of the JSA (or direct confirmation in case there are no more candidates than positions), with elections being held biennially. Yakuin taigu iin are named to their position by the chief director.

See also
List of sumo elders
List of sumo stables
Heya - sumo stable information
Japan Sumo Association
List of past sumo wrestlers
Glossary of sumo terms

References

External links

Complete list of toshiyori at the Japan Sumo Association
Kabu history
Oyakata Gallery

 
Sumo terminology